Murato is a commune in the Upper Corsica department of France on the island of Corsica.

Population

Monuments
San Michele de Murato

See also
Communes of the Haute-Corse department

References

Communes of Haute-Corse